In ancient Roman religion, sacra (Latin, neuter plural, "sacred [matters]") were transactions relating to the worship of the gods, especially sacrifice and prayer. They are either sacra privata or publica. The former were undertaken on behalf of the individual by himself, on behalf of the family by the pater familias, or on behalf of the gens by the whole body of the people.

Sacra privata
The centre of the domestic service of the gods is formed by the worship of the Penates and Lares. In particular cases recourse was also had to certain specified deities. Besides this, private sacra were attached to particular families; these passed to the heir with the succession and became a burden on him. Hence an inheritance without sacra [hereditas sine sacris] proverbially signified an unimpaired piece of good fortune. If a patrician wished to become a plebeian he had to renounce his familial sacra, his gens and his curia.  As the family had sacra, so also had the gens, which had arisen out of the family by expansion. These were performed by a sacrificial priest flamen appointed from among the gentiles, the celebration taking place in his own house or in a special sacellum in the presence of the assembled gentiles.

Sacra Privata typically takes place within the family.  An individual might perform sacra at any time and whenever they thought it necessary; but if he vowed such sacra before the pontiffs and wished that they should be continued after his death, his heirs inherited with his property the obligation to perform them, and the pontiffs had to watch that they were performed duly and at their proper time.  Even though Sacra could take place at any time, however, the devout Roman prayed and made a sacrifice typically during meal times.  The usual time was between dinner and dessert. When possible, a pig was sacrificed. Proper ceremonies accompanied all family occasions from birth to death, even when the gods were no longer popular. The gens of families had special rites, sacra. It must be maintained for the welfare of the clan and State.  If not, it was believed that gods will become displeased with the pater familias.  In return, their supposed underworld relatives, the malicious and vagrant Lemures, might be placated with midnight offerings of black beans and spring water.

For home sacrifices, citizens would usually use foods instead of animals because they were less messy.  However, it was not unheard of.  Many families would use small animals for their blood sacrifices.  Some foods that they would use were wine, cheese, fruits, milk, honey cakes, honeycombs, and grapes.  Families would also use incense, fire, or wreaths if they wanted a sacrifice that was more permanent.  Romans would use sacrifices that represented life.  If their ancestors became angry, they would placate them with an offering of black beans and spring water at midnight.

Lares, a household protector, was housed in a shrine along with the penates and favorite gods or goddesses.  In the homes of the lower class, the shrines were set in wall-niches with a basic painted background, whereas the upper class, built their shrines in the servants quarters.  This kept the focus on religion instead of making it a public showing.

Sacra publica
The sacra publica were undertaken pro populo, i.e., collectively, (1) by the curia, pagi, or vici, into which the community was divided, whence such sacrifices were called sacra popularia; or (2) by the individual gentes and societies, i.e., the sodalitas, to which the superintendence of a particular cult had been committed by the State; or (3) by the magistrates and priests of the Roman State. The sacra of the gentes were with few exceptions performed in public, though the multitude present remained silent spectators; only in a few cases they took part in the procession to the place of worship or in the sacrificial feast.

The public religious practices of Ancient Rome served multiple purposes due to the nature of its religion.  In ancient Rome, religion and the affairs of the state were closely intertwined so that the state religion was a mode of political power. Religious rituals and festivals were often held in order to calm and distract the people. This can be seen through the establishment of the Apollinares around the time of the Second Punic War. These public affairs were meant to honor the gods by either consisting of sporting competitions, such as the Apollinares, or religious rituals.  When these rituals consisted of sacrifice, they were controlled by the Emperor and the Elites

The correct practice of rituals, or orthopraxis was essential to currying favor of the gods. Public ceremonies were presided over by some sort of authority from the higher social class over public affairs, and in some rare cases specifically women. The presider would begin the ceremony at the start of the day and bathe himself or herself thoroughly beforehand. Any civilians in attendance would wear togas with a hood over their heads while the presider was bareheaded, often with a laurel wreath on his head for distinction. In live sacrifices, only domestic animals were used. These animals were cleaned and often decorated with ribbons or garlands with colors dependent on the god or goddess for whom they were intended. The Romans would also use fruit and grains in public ceremonies as well as libations or drinks. These inanimate sacrifices were not less significant than live animal sacrifices, but rather they all served different purposes and went to different deities.

References

Ancient Roman religion